"Marsella" is also the Spanish name of Marseille.

Marsella is a town and municipality in the Department of Risaralda, Colombia. 

A traditional colonial town in the coffee growing region of Colombia in the mountains, 15 miles from Pereira, Typical temperatures are 15-20°C most of the year with high rainfall typical of the area.

A colonial town is famous for its botanic garden Jardin Bontanico Marsella Alejandro Hombolt which was set up to promote ecological sustainability in the area, with a range of plants and wildlife as well as an education section with hands on science demonstrations of things like parabolic disks for bouncing sounds across the countryside, and the world's first catapult museum, set up in collaboration with local schools to preserve wildlife by getting children to donate their catapults to the museum. 

The town also has an historic cemetery Cementerio Jesus Maria Estrada, a colonial-style cultural centre and church in the main square and traditional galleria (market).

References

External links
 Marsella town website

See also
Marsella is also the Spanish name for Marseille, the city in France.

Municipalities of Risaralda Department